The 1996 Los Angeles County Board of Supervisors elections were held on November 5, 1996, coinciding with the 1996 United States presidential election. One of the five seats (for the Fourth District) of the Los Angeles County Board of Supervisors was contested in this election.

Results

Fourth District

References

External links 
 Los Angeles County Department of Registrar-Recorder/County Clerk

Los Angeles County Board of Supervisors
Los Angeles County Board of Supervisors elections
Los Angeles County